Kostolac Airport ( / Aerodrom Kostolac)  is situated on the bank of the Danube river, built in 1998 on the power plant's reclaimed former ash yard.  It is two kilometres from the Kostolac town centre and also near the town of Požarevac.

Landing at Kostolac Airport is unique, because the way of landing is over the Danube water plane, which is similar to landing on an aircraft carrier.

There is an international air show every August.
 
The Airport is close to the ancient Roman city of Viminacium.

See also 
List of airports in Serbia
Požarevac Airport

External links
YU-CAB Bellanca 7GCBC Citabria , January 10, 2003 on LYKT-KOSTOLAC
Galeb G-2 on LYKT, Galeb G-2
AVIO - TAXI KOSTOLAC,POŽAREVAC,SERBIA

Airports in Serbia